Craig Pardy is a Canadian politician, who was elected to the Newfoundland and Labrador House of Assembly in the 2019 provincial election. He represents the electoral district of Bonavista as a member of the Newfoundland and Labrador Progressive Conservative Party. He was re-elected in the 2021 provincial election.

Prior to politics, Pardy was a teacher and served as Chairperson of the Milton local service district and later as Mayor of the incorporated town of George's Brook-Milton. Pardy was diagnosed with cancer in 2021.

Election results

References

Living people
Progressive Conservative Party of Newfoundland and Labrador MHAs
21st-century Canadian politicians
1960 births